Joyce McDonald (born December 14, 1952) is an American politician from the state of Washington. A member of the Republican Party, McDonald served as a councilor for Pierce County, Washington from 2009 to 2016. She served in the Washington House of Representatives, representing the 25th district, from 1997–2001, 2003–2008, 2017–2018.

McDonald is from Puyallup, Washington. She ran for Pierce County Councilor in 2008, and won. She ran for reelection in 2012.

References

External links

Living people
Politicians from Puyallup, Washington
Republican Party members of the Washington House of Representatives
Women state legislators in Washington (state)
Pierce County Councillors
Place of birth missing (living people)
1952 births
21st-century American women